Jiang Zejia (November 1920 – 10 November 2013) was a Chinese electrical engineer and educator.

Biography
Jiang was born in November 1920 in Hankou, Hubei, with his ancestral home in Jingde County, Anhui. After the high school, he studied, then taught, at what is now Chongqing University. He went to study at McGill University in Canada in 1947.

He returned to China in 1948 and that year joined the Department of Electrical Engineering faculty of Chongqing University, he was promoted to professor in 1951. In 1951 Chongqing University appointed him director of its Electrical Engineering Department. In 1982, he became President of Chongqing University, serving until 1986. On November 10, 2013, he died of illness in the First Affiliated Hospital of Chongqing Medical University.

References

External links

1920 births
People from Jingde County, Anhui
2013 deaths
Chongqing University alumni
McGill University alumni
Presidents of Chongqing University
Engineers from Anhui
Educators from Anhui
People of the Republic of China
Chinese expatriates in Canada